László Szabó ( March 19, 1917 – August 8, 1998) was a Hungarian chess player. He was awarded the title of International Grandmaster in 1950, when it was instituted by FIDE.

Born in Budapest, Szabó burst onto the international chess scene in 1935, at the age of 18, winning the first of Hungarian Championships, an international tournament in Tatatóváros, and was selected to represent his country at the Warsaw Chess Olympiad. It is thought that the young Szabó studied under Géza Maróczy, then a patriarchal figure in Hungarian chess who had previously trained future world champions, Max Euwe and Vera Menchik.

Prior to World War II, there were other successes, including outright victory at Hastings 1938/39 (a tournament he was to hold a long association with).  He began a career as a banker, dealing in foreign exchange.

At the outbreak of war, Szabó was attached to a Forced Labour Unit and was later captured by Russian troops who held him as a prisoner of war. After the war, he returned to chess and played many major international events. 

He finished fifth at Groningen 1946, a tournament which included Mikhail Botvinnik, Max Euwe, Vasily Smyslov, Miguel Najdorf, Isaac Boleslavsky and Alexander Kotov. At the Saltsjöbaden Interzonal of 1948, he finished second to David Bronstein and took outright first place at Hastings 1947/48, Budapest 1948 and Hastings 1949/50. A share of fifth place at both the Saltsjöbaden 1952 Interzonal and the Gothenburg Interzonal of 1955, meant that each of his Interzonal finishes had been strong enough to merit him a place in the corresponding Candidates Tournament. It was at his third and final Candidates, held in Amsterdam in 1956, that Szabó made his most promising bid for a World Championship title challenge. He tied for third place with Bronstein, Efim Geller, Tigran Petrosian and Boris Spassky, behind Smyslov and Paul Keres.

Into the 1960s and 1970s, he continued to excel in international competition; first at Zagreb 1964, first at Budapest 1965 (with Lev Polugaevsky and Mark Taimanov), first at Sarajevo 1972, first at Hilversum 1973 (with Geller) and tied for first at Hastings 1973/74 (with Gennady Kuzmin, Jan Timman and Mikhail Tal).

In total, he represented Hungary at eleven Chess Olympiads, playing first board on five occasions and delivering many medal-winning performances.  In 1937, he took the team silver and individual silver medals, in 1952 an individual bronze, in 1956 a team bronze and in 1966, team bronze and individual silver.

Szabó was the best player in Hungary for nearly 20 years (eventually being succeeded by Lajos Portisch around 1963/64.) Chessmetrics.com, which attempts to rank players, suggests that Szabo was sixth in the world in 1946. 

His family donated Szabó's entire chess library and his papers to the Cleveland Public Library John G. White Chess and Checkers Collection. The John G. White Collection of Chess and Checkers is the largest chess library in the world (32,568 volumes of books and serials, including 6,359 volumes of bound periodicals.)

References

OlimpBase – The History of the Chess Olympiads

See also
 List of Jewish chess players

Books
 Meine besten Partien (German, 248 pages, paperback, 1990.) (https://www.schachversand.de/e/listen/autoren/243.html)
 My best games of chess (English, 209 pages, hardback, 1986.) (https://www.schachversand.de/e/listen/autoren/V243.html )

External links

 
 Competitions – Hungarian Chess Federation
 Cleveland Public Library John G. White Chess and Checkers Collection

1917 births
1998 deaths
Chess grandmasters
Chess Olympiad competitors
Hungarian chess players
Jewish chess players
Hungarian Jews
Sportspeople from Budapest
20th-century chess players
Hungarian World War II forced labourers
Hungarian prisoners of war
World War II prisoners of war held by the Soviet Union